is a Shinto shrine in Kushiro, Hokkaidō, Japan. It was founded at the beginning of the nineteenth century. A statue of Yakushi or Kannon by Enkū has been designated a Prefectural Cultural Property.

See also
 Itsukushima Jinja
 Enkū
 List of Shinto shrines in Hokkaidō

References

External links
 Itsukushima Jinja homepage

Shinto shrines in Hokkaido